The Texas lined snake (Tropidoclonion lineatum texanum) is a subspecies of nonvenomous snake in the subfamily Natricinae of the family Colubridae. The subspecies is endemic to the United States.

Geographic range
The Texas lined snake is found in the southcentral United States, primarily in the state of Texas.

Habitat
T. l. texanum is a relatively common fossorial subspecies, and spends most of its time buried in leaf litter.

Diet
The Texas lined snake preys upon earthworms.

Description
T. l. texanum is typically olive green to dark brown in color, with a distinctive yellow or cream-colored stripe down the center of the back. It has a small head and small eyes. It differs from other subspecies of T. lineatum by having fewer subcaudals: 33 or fewer in females, 40 or fewer in males.

References

Further reading
Ramsey LW (1953). "The Lined Snake, Tropidoclonion lineatum (Hallowell)". Herpetologica 9 (1): 7-24. (Tropidoclonion lineatum texanum, new subspecies).

External links

Colubrids